Stansted (referred to in older texts as Stanstead) is a village and rural parish in the Tonbridge and Malling district of the county of Kent in the United Kingdom (not to be confused with Stansted Mountfitchet or London Stansted Airport, both of which are in Essex).

It is located close to the M20 motorway. The Morris dancers of Stansted were one of the earliest groups to form from the revival of the activity, in 1934. The name Stansted means "stony place".

Filming location
In January 2007 the village was used as a semi-fictional location in the filming of an episode of EastEnders broadcast in the United Kingdom over the Easter 2007 holiday season. Additional scenes were filmed at Wormshill and Ringlestone as ostensibly the same village location, notwithstanding they are some 20 miles (30 kilometres) from Stansted.

Shooting
On 29 December 2007 villagers alerted the police to a man in the village brandishing a gun. Reports say, however, that it was perhaps the man himself who alerted the police Upon arrival, the police opened fire and eventually shot and killed him. The case has been handed over to the IPCC for consideration

BA confuse Stansted Airport with Stansted, Kent
In early 2007, British Airways mistakenly used inflight 'skymaps' that relocated Stansted Airport, Essex to Stansted in Kent. Skymaps show passengers their location, but the mistake was luckily not replicated on the pilots' navigation system. BA blamed outside contractors hired to make the map. "It was the mistake of the independent company that produced the software," said a spokeswoman. "The cartographer appears to have confused the vast Essex airport, which handles 25 million passengers a year, with this tiny Kent village, also called Stansted, which has a population of around 200".

References

External links

Villages in Kent